Futari wa Pretty Cure is the first Pretty Cure television series, airing on ANN and produced by Toei Animation. The story revolves around two girls, Nagisa Misumi and Honoka Yukishiro (Natalie Blackstone and Hannah Whitehouse), who fight the forces of the Dark Zone — a dimension of evil that has encroached on the Garden of Light. The first season aired in Japan between February 1, 2004 and January 30, 2005. The opening theme is "Danzen! Futari wa PreCure" (Danzen! ふたりはプリキュア Danzen! Futari wa Purikyua?, "Danzen! We Are Pretty Cure") by Mayumi Gojo whilst the ending theme is "Get You! Love Love?!" (ゲッチュウ!らぶらぶぅ?! Getchū! Rabu Rabu?!?) also by Gojo. It was dubbed in English and aired in Canada between March 6, 2009 and July 31, 2010. The opening theme of the English dub is: Together we are Pretty Cure.


Episode list 

{|class="wikitable"
|- style="border-bottom: 3px solid #CCF;"
! style="width:1%;"  | 
! Title
! style="width:14%;" | Original air date
! style="width:14%;" | English air date
|-

|}

References

External links 

 http://asahi.co.jp/precure/

2004 Japanese television seasons
2005 Japanese television seasons
Pretty Cure episode lists